Graeme Rinholm (born 18 October 1985) is a Canadian bobsledder and biochemist. He competed at the FIBT World Championships 2011 in Königssee, and at the 2014 Winter Olympics in Sochi, in four-man bobsleigh.

References

External links

1985 births
Living people
Bobsledders at the 2014 Winter Olympics
Canadian male bobsledders
Olympic bobsledders of Canada